Spain Avenue is an avenue in Lima, Peru. It extends from east to west in the districts of Lima and Breña along 7 blocks.

History
The avenue's inception began in the early 20th century, as the city of Lima expanded westward. The avenue's 3rd block begins at the site of the former Lima Penitentiary, today the Lima Civic Center.

From the late 1940s to the early 1990s, the avenue's intersection with Garcilaso de la Vega was the location of the former U.S. Embassy until its move to Monterrico due to being targeted by the terrorist group Shining Path on several occasions, as well as by the MRTA, who bombed the embassy on February 14, 1990.

Route
It starts at its intersection with the Plaza Grau and the Paseo de la República with a circulating direction from east to west. Between Paseo de la República and Avenida Garcilaso de la Vega, the avenue passes under a bridge, near the Civic Center. The 4th block of the avenue houses the art deco-style building of the Provincial Sub-Prefecture of Lima.

The intersection with Garcilaso de la Vega is the location of the Clínica Internacional since the 1990s and of the Casa Matusita, a house known for the popular belief of being of the paranormal type.

References

España